James Waddell may refer to:

James Waddel (1739–1805), American preacher
James Waddell (army officer) (1872–1954), New Zealand soldier
James Waddell (civil servant) (1914–2004), British civil servant
James Iredell Waddell (1824–1886), Confederate naval officer
Jimmy Waddell, Scottish curler